Dražen Žeželj (born 6 February 1976) is a retired Slovenian footballer who played as a forward.

Žeželj had spells with a number of Slovenian clubs during his career, and he also had stints abroad in Greece with Niki Volos and in Austria with SAK Klagenfurt. Žeželj was also Slovenian PrvaLiga top scorer in the 2003–04 season.

References

External links
Profile at NZS 

1976 births
Living people
Footballers from Ljubljana
Slovenian footballers
Slovenia youth international footballers
Association football forwards
Slovenian PrvaLiga players
Slovenian Second League players
Super League Greece players
NK Olimpija Ljubljana (1945–2005) players
NK Mura players
NK Ljubljana players
NK Primorje players
Panionios F.C. players
Niki Volos F.C. players
NK Domžale players
NK Radomlje players
Slovenian expatriate footballers
Slovenian expatriate sportspeople in Greece
Expatriate footballers in Greece
Slovenian expatriate sportspeople in Austria
Expatriate footballers in Austria